Robert Alan Rafsky (July 22, 1945 – February 21, 1993) was an American writer, publicist, and HIV/AIDS activist.

Early life and education 
Robert Alan Rafsky was born July 22, 1945, to civil servant William L. Rafsky of Łódź, Poland and Selma Rafsky née Chafets in Philadelphia. His family was politically active. Lawrence C. Rafsky was his brother. He enrolled at Harvard College in the fall of 1963. Rafsky lived in Wigglesworth and volunteered at the Loeb Drama Center. He was expelled for academic reasons but was later readmitted in 1964 and later became the managing editor of The Harvard Crimson. Rafsky graduated Harvard in 1968.

Career 
Rafsky worked as a teacher after graduation, but ultimately pursued more lucrative careers.

Rafsky worked in public relations in New York. He worked for the Empire State Development Corporation, Howard Rubenstein & Associates, and Pro-Media.

Rafsky became involved with ACT UP in 1987 after his diagnosis with AIDS. He later became the chief spokesperson of ACT UP, assisting the organization to gain prominent national coverage. Correspondent and organizer Victor Zonana remarked that Rafsky "was articulate, contentious, persuasive, dogged and very often right." David B. Feinberg called Rafsky the "heart and soul of ACT UP." Rafsky was a nationally recognized HIV/AIDS activist. His 1992 confrontation with then-presidential candidate Bill Clinton secured much publicity and made HIV/AIDS a presidential campaign issue. Rafsky said, "I can't calm down. I'm dying of AIDS while you're dying of ambition," to which Clinton eventually responded, "I feel your pain." Rafsky also helped draft an AIDS agenda for the Clinton Administration. Additionally, in 1992 Rafsky delivered a speech titled "Bury Me Furiously" at the funeral of fellow ACT UP member Mark Fisher. Within the speech, Rafsky demanded change and publicly denounced the Bush administration for their negligence of the AIDS epidemic. The impact of both the confrontation with Bill Clinton and "Bury Me Furiously" led to not only increased national awareness for the epidemic, but priority for policy within the Clinton administration.

Rafsky was an active member of the Treatment Action Group. Peter Staley said that Rafsky was "enormously influential" in one-to-one interactions. Rafsky wrote personal essays about AIDS for The New York Times, The Village Voice, New York Daily News, OutWeek, and QW. He was writing a book comprising letters to his daughter at the time of his death.

Personal life 
He was married to Babette Krolik and had a daughter named Sara. He came out in 1985 and later divorced his wife, sharing joint custody of their daughter. It was at this time that Rafsky began telling his friends he was gay. Around 1987, he contracted AIDS. He died of AIDS-related complications on February 21, 1993, at the New York University Medical Center.

Legacy 
Rafsky's role with ACT UP was a focal part of the 2012 documentary How to Survive a Plague.

See also 

 LGBT culture in New York City
 List of AIDS activists

References

External links
 

LGBT people from Pennsylvania
American publicists
Harvard College alumni
HIV/AIDS activists
1945 births
1993 deaths
AIDS-related deaths in New York (state)
20th-century American male writers
20th-century American non-fiction writers
Writers from New York City
Writers from Philadelphia
American gay writers
American people of Polish descent
20th-century American LGBT people